The 27th Tennessee Infantry Regiment (also known as the "Twenty-seventh Tennessee") was an infantry formation in the Confederate States Army during the American Civil War, and was successively commanded by Colonels C. H. Williams and A. W. Caldwell. The regiment was assigned to Maney's Brigade, Cheatham's Division, 1st Corps, Army of Tennessee, and on January 1, 1863, consolidated with the 1st (Field's) Tennessee Infantry Regiment.

History
The Twenty-seventh Tennessee was organized on September 10, 1861, at Camp Trenton, from new and existing companies of volunteer infantry. Its 833 men were from the counties of Benton, McNairy, Obion, Henderson, Decatur, Crockett, Weakley, and Carroll. It was furnished arms at Columbus, Kentucky, then fought at Shiloh, Munfordville, and Perryville. The regiment was assigned to Maney's Brigade, Cheatham's Division, 1st Corps, Army of Tennessee, and on January 1, 1863, consolidated with the 1st (Field's) Tennessee Infantry Regiment. It participated in many conflicts from Murfreesboro to Atlanta, endured Hood's winter operations, and ended the war in North Carolina attached to Palmer's Brigade. The regiment totaled 580 effectives in December 1861, and lost 54 percent of the 350 at Shiloh and 53 percent of the 210 at Perryville. The 1st and 27th Tennessee Infantry had 83 casualties of the 457 at Murfreesboro, reported 14 killed and 75 wounded at Chickamauga, and in late 1863, totaled 456 men and 290 arms. Only a remnant surrendered on April 26, 1865.

Regimental order of battle
Units of the Twenty-seventh Tennessee included:

 Company A
 Company B
 Company C
 Company D (Felix Rebels)
 Company E (Decatur Tigers)
 Company F
 Company G 
 Company H
 Company I
 Company K (Henderson County Sharpshooters)

See also
 List of Tennessee Confederate Civil War units

Notes

References

Further reading

 
 
 
 
 
 

1861 establishments in Tennessee
1865 disestablishments in North Carolina
Military units and formations established in 1861
Military units and formations disestablished in 1865
Units and formations of the Confederate States Army from Tennessee